Brutal Planet is the fourteenth solo studio album by American rock musician Alice Cooper, released in 2000. Musically, this finds Alice tackling a much darker and heavier approach than on previous albums, with many songs approaching a somewhat modern-sounding, industrial/metal sound.  Lyrically, it deals with themes of dark "social fiction", including domestic violence ("Take It Like a Woman"), prejudice ("Blow Me a Kiss"), psychopathic behavior ("It's the Little Things"), war ("Pick Up the Bones"), depression, suicide ("Sanctuary"), Neo-Nazism and school shootings ("Wicked Young Man"). The album was followed by a sequel, titled Dragontown (2001).

Doug Van Pelt, editor of the alternative Christian music-oriented HM Magazine, found that the lyrics communicated biblical morals "in a very powerful way". Van Pelt stated further that the final argument is provided in the title track, which condemns the systems of judgment that the world uses. Moreover, "Blow Me a Kiss" urges the listener to think deeper about spiritual matters.

Track listing

Personnel
Alice Cooper – vocals
Ryan Roxie – guitars
Phil X – guitars
China - guitars
Eric Singer – drums
Bob Marlette – rhythm guitar, bass, keyboards

Additional Musicians
Sid Riggs – additional programming, sound design
Eva King – strings arrangement
Natalie Delaney – backing vocals (track 1)

Production
Produced by Bob Marlette
Executive producer – Bob Ezrin
Engineered, mixed and arranged by Bob Marlette
Additional engineering – Dave Reed, German Villacorta
Assistant engineers – German Villacorta, Jaime Sickora 
Mastered by Dave Collins
Recorded at the Blue Room, Woodland Hills, CA and the A&M Studios, Los Angeles, CA
Mixed, Mastered at the A&M Studios, Los Angeles, CA

References

Alice Cooper albums
2000 albums
Concept albums
Albums produced by Bob Marlette
Spitfire Records albums